The Stanley Mosque is in Stanley, Hong Kong, China. It is the fourth mosque built in Hong Kong and it is located at the Stanley Prison.

History
In the early 20th century, there were around 400 Muslim employees from Pakistan and India working for the Prison Department of Hong Kong. The headquarters office of the department was initially at Arbuthnot Road. Most of them went to Jamia Mosque to perform their prayer. However, following the relocation of the headquarters from Arbuthnot Road to Stanley Prison, which is much further away, there was a demand to set up a new mosque around the prison area to cater for the welfare and religious needs for the prison Muslim staffs. Thus, Stanley Mosque was opened inside the prison on 1 January 1937.

The Advisory Board of Antiquities and Monuments Office designated the mosque as a Grade I historic building on 18 December 2009.

Due to the safety reasons, the Correctionals Services staffs limited access to the mosque but also you can show them your HK ID card or tell them that "I came here for only praying".

The Imam of the mosque is Hafiz Afzal Khan, he also teaches Quran in the mosque and leads the prayer. He has been the Imam of the mosque for over 20 years.

Architecture
The sandy coloured mosque has a large prayer hall, veranda and courtyard. A parking area is located in front of the mosque. The mosque is not generally open to the public as it is within the prison grounds.

See also
 Islam in Hong Kong
 List of mosques in Hong Kong

References

1937 establishments in Hong Kong
Mosques in Hong Kong
Pakistani diaspora in Asia
Mosques completed in 1937
Grade I historic buildings in Hong Kong